The following highways are numbered 335:

Australia

Canada
 New Brunswick Route 335
 Newfoundland and Labrador Route 335
 Nova Scotia Route 335
 Quebec Route 335
 Prince Edward Island Route 335
 Saskatchewan Highway 335

Costa Rica
 National Route 335

India
 National Highway 335 (India)

Japan
 Japan National Route 335

United States
  Interstate 335
  County Road 335 (Levy County, Florida)
  Arkansas Highway 335
  Georgia State Route 335
  Indiana State Road 335
  Kentucky Route 335
  Maryland Route 335
 New York:
  New York State Route 335
  County Route 335 (Erie County, New York)
  Ohio State Route 335
  Oregon Route 335
  Puerto Rico Highway 335
  Tennessee State Route 335
 Texas:
  Texas State Highway 335
  Texas State Highway Loop 335
  Virginia State Route 335
  Wyoming Highway 335